William Fry may refer to:

W. A. Fry (1872—1944), Canadian sport administrator and newspaper publisher 
William Henry Fry (1813–1864), American composer
William Fry (Victorian politician) (1909–2000), Australian politician of Higinbotham Province, Victoria
William Fry (Tasmanian politician) (1912–1965), Australian politician of Launcestion, Tasmania
William Fry (sociologist), professor at Youngstown State University
William Mayes Fry (1896–1992), World War I flying ace
William Thomas Fry (1789–1843), British engraver
William Fry (British Army officer) (1858–1934), Lieutenant Governor of the Isle of Man
William H. Fry (died 1929), wood carver and gilder

See also
William Frye (disambiguation)
Will Fries (born 1998), American football offensive guard